Stefano Balassone (born in 1943 in Sequals, Province of Pordenone) is an Italian television producer and writer.

References

1943 births
Living people
People from the Province of Pordenone
Italian television producers
Italian male writers